Telma (Macedonian: Телма Телевизија) is a private channel in North Macedonia.

Programmes
Telma was founded in September 1941. The current number of employees is approximately 150 (managing and editorial board, journalists, reporters, announcers, technical staff, marketing and administration) and there are also a large number of correspondents and external cooperators. One of the best things on this channel are the News broadcasting every day at 15:00, 18:30 and 21:40h (GMT +1). Also the Italian Serie A is traditional broadcasting on TV Telma. Telma is one of the most viewed TV channels in North Macedonia.

This Television been broadcaster for Italian League Serie A

Line up

Telma Shows

 News (Macedonian: Вести) 
 Music (Macedonian: Музика)
 That is Me (Macedonian: Тоа сум јас)
 Filmopolis (Macedonian: Филмополис)
 Cultural Chronic (Macedonian:  Културна хроника)
 Everyone is VIP (Macedonian: Секој е ВИП)
 Auto-magazin (Macedonian: Авто-магазин) 
 Food and Wine - show for gourmands (Macedonian: Храна и вино - емисија за гурмани)
 Kotoledonija (Macedonian: Котиледонија)
 Sixth Day (Macedonian: Шестиот ден - контактно-забавен магазин) 
 Optional (Macedonian: Незадолжително) 
 Makplanet (Macedonian: Макпланет) 
 Go home (Macedonian: Ајде дома)
 KOD with Snežana Lupeska (Macedonian: КОД со Снежана Лупеска)

Foreign TV Shows

 Dexter (Macedonian: Декстер)
 Battlestar Galactica (Macedonian: Бетлстар Галактика)
 Bandolera (Macedonian: Бандолера)
 Monty Python's Flying Circus (Macedonian: Летачкиот циркус на Монти Пајтон)
 Gran Hotel (Macedonian: Гранд Хотел)
 Legends of Chima (Macedonian: Легендата за Чима)
 House (Macedonian: Др. Хаус)
 La impostora (Macedonian: Измамничка)
 Borgen (Macedonian: Премиерка)
 The Ellen DeGeneres Show (Macedonian: Eлен шоу )

External links

Categories

Television channels in North Macedonia
Television channels and stations established in 1997
Mass media in Skopje